Kjosen is a village in Tromsø Municipality in Troms og Finnmark county, Norway. It is located at the end of the Kaldfjorden, immediately north of the village of Kaldfjord.

References

Villages in Troms
Tromsø
Populated places of Arctic Norway